Leif Kristian Nestvold-Haugen (born 29 November 1987) is a Norwegian World Cup alpine ski racer, specializing in the technical events of giant slalom and slalom.

Haugen made his World Cup debut in October 2009 in Sölden, and collected his first World Cup points with a 26th place. He won a bronze medal in giant slalom at the World Championships in 2017 and attained his first World Cup podium in March 2017 at Kranjska Gora, Slovenia.

Nestvold-Haugen represents the sports club Lommedalens IL, and hails from Lommedalen. At the Junior World Championships, he achieved two seventh places in 2006 in Mont-Sainte-Anne and an eighth place in 2007 in Flachau.

Personal life
Nestvold-Haugen is from Lommedalen, Norway. His sister is Norwegian alpine skier Kristine Gjelsten Haugen. He studied finance and international business in the United States at the University of Denver and graduated in 2012.

World Cup results

Season standings

Race podiums

 3 podiums – (3 GS); 34 top tens

World Championship results

Olympic results

References

External links
 
 
 

1987 births
Living people
Sportspeople from Bærum
Norwegian male alpine skiers
Norwegian expatriates in the United States
Alpine skiers at the 2010 Winter Olympics
Olympic alpine skiers of Norway
Alpine skiers at the 2014 Winter Olympics
Alpine skiers at the 2018 Winter Olympics
Medalists at the 2018 Winter Olympics
Olympic medalists in alpine skiing
Olympic bronze medalists for Norway
Denver Pioneers athletes